Artesa is a Papago Indian village located in Pima County, Arizona in the area of the Baboquivari Peak Wilderness in the Papago Indian Reservation. The village was established in about 1907. Kumkachutz Wawasit or Komoktetuvávosit is its traditional name, which means "Where the turtle was caught" in the O'odham, or Papago, language.

References

Populated places in Pima County, Arizona